Nyéléni was a woman from  Sirakoro in Mali, Africa. During the first International Food Sovereignty Forum, which took place in Sélingué, Mali in February 2007, it was decided to name the network for Food Sovereignty in her honour.

External links 
 International Nyéléni forum for Food Sovereignty homepage

References

Populated places in Sikasso Region